Mohamad Daas is a Syrian footballer who plays for Al-Ahli which compete in the Bahraini Premier League.

References

External links
 Profile at Goalzz.com

Living people
1989 births
Syrian footballers
Syrian expatriate footballers
Expatriate footballers in Iraq
Syrian expatriate sportspeople in Iraq
Syrian expatriate sportspeople in Bahrain
Sportspeople from Aleppo
Association football defenders
Syrian Premier League players
Naft Al-Basra SC players